Gracillaria chalcanthes is a moth of the family Gracillariidae. It is known from Myanmar.

References

Gracillariinae
Moths described in 1894